Nuummioq is a 2009 Greenlandic drama film directed by Otto Rosing and Torben Bech and produced by Mikisoq H. Lynge. Nuummioq  means "a man from Nuuk" in the Greenlandic language. Nuummioq premiered in Nuuk on 31 October 2009.

Plot 
Malik, a 35-year-old construction worker from Nuuk discovers the love of his life at the time when he is diagnosed with cancer. He faces the choice of staying in Greenland with Nivi, the woman he has come to love − or leaving for Denmark in search of medical treatment.

Production 
Nuummioq is the first feature film produced entirely in Greenland. Filming began on 4 August 2008 in the area around Nuuk. The script was written by Torben Bech based on an original idea by Otto Rosing.

Torben Bech the screenwriter consulted the film in pre production and due to director Otto Rosings personal problems with depression Bech later assumed directorial duties and completed the film with producer Mikisoq H. Lynge. He is co-credited Director with Otto Rosing.

The film was produced by Mikisoq H. Lynge of 3900 Pictures, sponsored by Royal Arctic Line, the state-owned, Greenlandic freight company.

Cast 
The film cast included professional and amateur actors from Greenland and Denmark:

Lars Rosing as Malik
Julie Berthelsen as Nivi
Angunnguaq Larsen as Mikael
Maius Olsen as Sheep Farmer
Makka Kleist as Grandma
Amos Egede as Grandfather
Morten Rose as Carsten
Else Danis as Medical
Anja Jochimsen as Tourist
Ulrikka Holm as a Girl in bar
Maria P. Kjærulff as Nurse
Arnatsiaq Reimer Eriksen as Lilly
Sorya Paprajong as Waiter at a restaurant
Johannes Madsen, as a Woman in greenhouse
Karsten Sommer as Customer in greenhouse
Maria Panínguak’ Kjærulff as a nurse

Reception 
Nuummioq premiered at the 2010 Sundance Film Festival selected in the World Cinema Dramatic Competition. The reception of the film was positive, focusing on the moody atmosphere reminiscent of the works of Ingmar Bergman.

It became the first Greenlandic film to be submitted for the Academy Award for Best Foreign Language Film, but it didn't make the final shortlist.

See also
 List of submissions to the 83rd Academy Awards for Best Foreign Language Film
 List of Greenlandic submissions for the Academy Award for Best Foreign Language Film

References

External links 
 
 

2009 films
Greenlandic drama films
Greenlandic-language films
2000s Danish-language films
2009 drama films
Nuuk
Films shot in Greenland
Films set in Greenland